The 1965 Connecticut Huskies baseball team represented the University of Connecticut in the 1965 NCAA University Division baseball season. The Huskies were led by Larry Panciera in his 4th year as head coach, and played as part of the Yankee Conference. The Huskies lost their first game against  before defeating Lafayette and being eliminated by Washington State.

Roster

Schedule

References 

Connecticut
UConn Huskies baseball seasons
Connecticut baseball
Yankee Conference baseball champion seasons
College World Series seasons